The Mares of Diomedes, also called the Mares of Thrace, were a herd of man-eating horses in Greek mythology. Magnificent, wild, and uncontrollable, they belonged to Diomedes of Thrace (not to be confused with Diomedes, son of Tydeus), king of Thrace, son of Ares and Cyrene who lived on the shores of the Black Sea. Bucephalus, Alexander the Great's horse, was said to be descended from these mares.

Mythology 
As the eighth of his Twelve Labours, also categorised as the second of the Non-Peloponnesian labours, Heracles was sent by King Eurystheus to steal the Mares from Diomedes. The mares’ madness was attributed to their unnatural diet which consisted of the flesh of unsuspecting guests or strangers to the island. Some versions of the myth say that the mares also expelled fire when they breathed. The Mares, which were the terror of Thrace, were kept tethered by iron chains to a bronze manger in the now vanished city of Tirida and were named Podargos (the swift), Lampon (the shining), Xanthos (the yellow) and Deinos (or Deinus, the terrible). Although very similar, there are slight variances in the exact details regarding the mares’ capture. 

In one version, Heracles brought a number of volunteers to help him capture the giant horses. After overpowering Diomedes’ men, Heracles broke the chains that tethered the horses and drove the mares down to sea. Unaware that the mares were man-eating and uncontrollable, Heracles left them in the charge of his favored companion, Abderus, while he left to fight Diomedes. Upon his return, Heracles found that the boy was eaten. As revenge, Heracles fed Diomedes to his own horses and then founded Abdera next to the boy's tomb.

In another version, Heracles, who was visiting the island, stayed awake so that he didn't have his throat cut by Diomedes in the night, and cut the chains binding the horses once everyone was asleep. Having scared the horses onto the high ground of a knoll, Heracles quickly dug a trench through the peninsula, filling it with water and thus flooding the low lying plain. When Diomedes and his men turned to flee, Heracles killed them with an axe (or a club), and fed Diomedes’ body to the horses to calm them.

In yet another version, Heracles first captured Diomedes and fed him to the mares before releasing them. Only after realizing that their King was dead did his men, the Bistonians, attack Heracles. Upon seeing the mares charging at them, led in a chariot by Abderus, the Bistonians turned and fled.

All versions have eating human flesh make the horses calmer, giving Heracles the opportunity to bind their mouths shut, and easily take them back to King Eurystheus, who dedicated the horses to Hera. In some versions, they were allowed to roam freely around Argos, having become permanently calm, but in others, Eurystheus ordered the horses taken to Olympus to be sacrificed to Zeus, but Zeus refused them, and sent wolves, lions, and bears to kill them. Roger Lancelyn Green states in his Tales of the Greek Heroes that the mares’ descendants were used in the Trojan War, and survived even to the time of Alexander the Great. After the incident, Eurystheus sent Heracles to bring back Hippolyta's Girdle.

Classical Literature Sources 

Chronological listing of classical literature sources for the Mares of Diomedes:

 Euripides, The Madness of Hercules, 379 ff (trans. Way) (Greek tragedy C5th BC)
 Euripides, Alcestis 479 ff (trans. Coleridge) (Greek tragedy C5th BC)
 Diodorus Siculus, Library of History 4. 15. 3 - 4 (trans. Oldfather) (Greek history C1st BC)
 Lucretius, Of the Nature of Things 5 Proem 1 (trans. Leonard) (Roman philosophy C1st BC)
 Ovid, Heroides 9. 69 ff (trans. Showerman) (Roman poetry C1st BC to C1st AD)
 Ovid, Heroides 9. 87 ff
 Ovid, Metamorphoses 9. 194 ff (trans. Miller) (Roman poetry C1st BC to C1st AD)
 Strabo, Geography 7 Fragment 43 (44) (trans. Jones) (Greek geography C1st BC to C1st AD)
 Strabo, Geography 7 Fragment 46 (47)
 Philippus of Thessalonica, The Twelve Labors of Hercules (The Greek Classics ed. Miller Vol 3 1909 p. 397) (Greek epigrams C1st AD)
 Lucan, The Pharsalia of Lucan 2. 149 ff (trans. Riley) (Roman poetry C1st AD)
 Seneca, Agamemnon 850 ff (trans. Miller) (Roman tragedy C1st AD)
 Seneca, Agamemnon 842 ff
 Seneca, Hercules Furens 226 ff (trans. Miller)
 Seneca, Hercules Oetaeus 20 ff (trans. Miller)
 Seneca, Hercules Oetaeus 1538 ff
 Seneca, Hercules Oetaeus 1814 ff
 Seneca, Hercules Oetaeus 1894 ff
 Seneca, Troades 1105 ff (trans. Miller)
 Statius, Thebaid 12. 154 ff (trans. Mozley) (Roman epic poetry C1st AD)
 Pseudo-Apollodorus, The Library 2. 5. 8 (trans. Frazer) (Greek mythography C2nd AD)
 Pausanias, Description of Greece 3. 18. 12 (trans. Jones) (Greek travelogue C2nd AD)
 Pausanias, Description of Greece 5. 10. 9
 Pseudo-Hyginus, Fabulae 30 (trans. Grant) (Roman mythography C2nd AD).
 Pseudo-Hyginus, Fabulae 159
 Ptolemaei Hephaestionis, Novarum historiarum Lib. 2 (trans. Roulez 1834 p. 70) (Alexandrine history C2 AD)
 Gellius, The Attic Nights 3. 9 (trans Beloe) (Greek history C2AD)
 Philostratus the Elder, Imagines 1. 17 (trans. Fairbanks) (Greek rhetoric C3rd AD)
 Philostratus the Elder, Imagines 2. 25 The Burial of Abderos
 Philostratus, Life of Apollonius of Tyana 5. 5 (trans. Conyreare) (Greek sophistry C3rd AD)
 Quintus Smyrnaeus, Fall of Troy 6. 245 ff (trans. Way) (Greek epic poetry C4th AD)
 Stephanus Byzantium, Ethnicorum Quae Supersunt, s.v. Abdêra (ed. Meinekii) (Greco-Byzantine mythography C6AD)
 Boethius, The Consolation of Philosophy 4. 7. 13 ff (trans. Rand & Stewart) (Roman philosophy C6th AD)
 Tzetzes, Chiliades or Book of Histories 2. 299 ff (trans. Untila et al.) (Greco-Byzantine history C12 AD)
 Tzetzes, Chiliades or Book of Histories 2. 499 ff
 Tzetzes, Chiliades or Book of Histories 2. 799 ff

Mares of Diomedes in modern fiction 

 Percy Jackson and the Olympians- The Battle of the Labyrinth, by Rick Riordan.

Although not referred to directly as the Mares of Diomedes in the book, Diomedes himself is mentioned in chapter eight (We Visit the Demon Dude Ranch), and the horses, who are mentioned in chapters eight and nine (I Scoop Poop), are described as both fire-breathing and flesh-eating.

 The Labours of Hercules by Agatha Christie

The Labours of Hercules is divided into twelve stories, each named after one of the Twelve Labours of Hercules in Greek mythology. One such story is called "The Horses of Diomedes".

See also
 List of fictional horses

References

Sources
 Pseudo-Apollodorus, Bibliotheca ii.5.8
 Diodorus Siculus. Bibliotheca historica, Book 4.15
 Quintus Smyrnaeus. Fall of Troy, Book 6.270 ff
 Philostratus the Elder. Imagines 2.25

External links
12 Labours
Hercules' Eighth Labor: the Horses of Diomedes; Perseus Project, Tufts University

Greek mythology of Thrace
Labours of Hercules
Monsters in Greek mythology
Horses in mythology
Fire-breathing monsters
Female legendary creatures